Paoa Point is a jutting headland between Mahaulepu Beach and Haula Beach on the south-east coast of the island of Kauai in the Hawaiian Islands.

Headlands of Kauai